1826 Miller, provisional designation , is a stony Eoan asteroid from the outer region of the asteroid belt, approximately 24 kilometers in diameter.

It was discovered on 14 September 1955, by the Indiana Asteroid Program at Goethe Link Observatory near Brooklyn, Indiana, United States, and named after American entrepreneur John Miller.

Orbit and classification 

Miller is a member of the Eos family, the largest asteroid family in the outer main belt consisting of nearly 10,000 asteroids.

The asteroid orbits the Sun in the outer main-belt at a distance of 2.7–3.2 AU once every 5 years and 2 months (1,894 days). Its orbit has an eccentricity of 0.08 and an inclination of 9° with respect to the ecliptic.

Physical characteristics 

Miller is an assumed stony S-type asteroid.

Rotation period 

In March 2010, a rotational lightcurve of Miller was obtained from photometric observation taken at Oakley Southern Sky Observatory in Australia. It gave a longer-than average rotation period of 30.049 hours with a brightness variation of 0.08 magnitude, superseding a previous result of 6.77 hours by amateur astronomer René Roy, who derived it from a fragmentary lightcurve obtained in December 2002.

Diameter and albedo 

According to the surveys carried out by the Infrared Astronomical Satellite IRAS, the Japanese Akari satellite, and NASA's Wide-field Infrared Survey Explorer with its subsequent NEOWISE mission, Miller measures between 19.74 and 26.34 kilometers in diameter, and its surface has an albedo between 0.111 and 0.196. The Collaborative Asteroid Lightcurve Link derives an albedo of 0.1085 and a diameter of 24.31 kilometers with an absolute magnitude of 11.1. The asteroid was also involved in the asteroid occultation of a 10th magnitude star in the constellation Cancer in April 2004.

Naming 

It was named in honor of American entrepreneur John A. Miller (1872–1941), founder of the Astronomy Department at Indiana University and first director of the Kirkwood Observatory, which he built and named for his former teacher. He also built the Sproul Observatory at Swarthmore College in the U.S state of Pennsylvania (also see 1578 Kirkwood). The official  was published by the Minor Planet Center on 15 October 1977.

References

External links 
 Asteroid Lightcurve Database (LCDB), query form (info )
 Dictionary of Minor Planet Names, Google books
 Asteroids and comets rotation curves, CdR – Observatoire de Genève, Raoul Behrend
 Discovery Circumstances: Numbered Minor Planets (1)-(5000) – Minor Planet Center
 (1826) Miller at ipa.nw.ru
 
 

001826
001826
Named minor planets
19550914